Ashleigh Orchard (formerly Baxter) (born 21 December 1991) is an Irish female rugby union player and coach. She has made 87 appearances for Ireland Sevens in the World Rugby Women's Sevens Series, and represented Ireland at the Women's Rugby World Cup in 2014 and 2017.

She began playing tag rugby before she joined a club in Lisburn; As of 2014, she played for Belfast Harlequins. For the 2022–23 season, she joined the Ulster Women's coaching team, and took a player-coach role at Cooke RFC. She was named Ulster Rugby Personality of the Year in the 2022 Ulster Rugby Awards.

She studied Aerospace engineering at Queen's University Belfast.

References

External links
Irish Rugby Player Profile

1991 births
Living people
Irish female rugby union players
Ireland women's international rugby union players
Irish rugby union coaches
Alumni of Queen's University Belfast
Belfast Harlequins rugby union players
Ireland international women's rugby sevens players
Ulster Rugby women's players
Rugby union players from Northern Ireland
Sportswomen from Northern Ireland